is a town located in Gunma Prefecture, Japan. , the town had an estimated population of 5,495 in 5630 households, and a population density of 41 persons per km². The controversial Yanba Dam project is located within Naganohara.

Geography
Located in the northwestern portion of Gunma Prefecture, almost all of Naganohara has an elevation higher than 500 meters. The town has Mount Kusatsu-Shirane (2171m) to the north and Mount Asama (2568m) to the south.
 Rivers: Agatsuma River, Shirasuna River, Kuma River

Surrounding municipalities
Gunma Prefecture
 Takasaki
 Higashiagatsuma
 Tsumagoi
 Nakanojō
 Kusatsu
Nagano Prefecture
 Karuizawa

Climate
Naganohara has a Humid continental climate (Köppen Cfa) characterized by warm summers and cold winters with heavy snowfall.  The average annual temperature in Naganohara is 7.6 °C. The average annual rainfall is 1453 mm with September as the wettest month. The temperatures are highest on average in August, at around 20.4 °C, and lowest in January, at around -4.7 °C.

Demographics
Per Japanese census data, the population of Naganohara has declined over the past 70 years.

History
The area of present-day Naganohara has human remains from the Japanese Paleolithic through Jōmon periods, although archaeological findings from the Kofun period are scarce compared with surrounding areas. During the Edo period, the area was part of the hatamoto-administered territory within Kōzuke Province.

Naganohara Town was created within Agatsuma District of Gunma Prefecture on April 1, 1889, with the creation of the modern municipalities system after the Meiji Restoration.

Government
Naganohara has a mayor-council form of government with a directly elected mayor and a unicameral town council of 10 members. Naganohara collectively with the other municipalities in Agatsuma District, contributes two members to the Gunma Prefectural Assembly. In terms of national politics, the town is part of Gunma 5th district of the lower house of the Diet of Japan.

Economy
The economy of Naganohara is heavily dependent on agriculture.

Education
Naganohara has four public elementary schools and two public middle schools operated by the town government, and one public high schools operated by the Gunma Prefectural Board of Education.

Transportation

Railway
 JR East – Agatsuma Line
  -  -  -

Highway

Local attractions
Kawarayu Onsen
Asama Volcano Museum
Agatsuma Gorge, a National Place of Scenic Beauty

References

External links

Official Website 

Towns in Gunma Prefecture
Naganohara, Gunma